Two submarines of the Royal Netherlands Navy have borne the name HNLMS Walrus (S802), in honor of the walrus.

 HNLMS Walrus (1) was originally , a United States Navy , launched in 1944 and decommissioned in 1946. The ship was loaned to the Netherlands in 1953; she was commissioned in the Royal Netherlands Navy as HNLMS Walrus (S802). In 1971, Walrus was sold for scrap.

References 

Royal Netherlands Navy ship names